Burr Plato (–1905) was a Canadian political figure.

Of African-American background, he was born into slavery in Logan County, today part of West Virginia. Burr succeeded in escaping enslavement and making his way to Canada in 1856 after an arduous journey culminating in a swim to freedom across the Niagara River to Canada West, where he settled. With a reputation locally in Niagara Falls, Ontario, for honesty in business affairs, Plato became a prominent property owner and served from 1886 to 1901 in Niagara Falls as an elected councillor.

Plato died in 1905.

References

 City of Niagara Falls Museums – Black History at www.niagarafallsmuseum.ca
 Electoral firsts in Canada#African-Canadians

1833 births
1905 deaths
People from Logan County, West Virginia
19th-century American slaves
American emigrants to pre-Confederation Ontario
Black Canadian politicians
Niagara Falls, Ontario city councillors
Immigrants to the Province of Canada
Black Canadian businesspeople
Canadian people of African-American descent